Weida-Land is a Verbandsgemeinde ("collective municipality") in the Saalekreis district, in Saxony-Anhalt, Germany. It is situated between Querfurt and Eisleben. Before 1 January 2010, it was a Verwaltungsgemeinschaft. The seat of the Verbandsgemeinde is in Nemsdorf-Göhrendorf.

The Verbandsgemeinde Weida-Land consists of the following municipalities:

 Barnstädt 
 Farnstädt
 Nemsdorf-Göhrendorf
 Obhausen
 Schraplau
 Steigra

References

Verbandsgemeinden in Saxony-Anhalt